Garth: Live at Notre Dame was a 2018 American concert television special by country music artist Garth Brooks televised by CBS on December 2, 2018. It was filmed at Notre Dame Stadium in Notre Dame, Indiana, on October 20, 2018.

Setlist
There were 23 songs performed:

 "All Day Long"
 "That Summer"
 "Two of a Kind Working on a Full House" 
 "The River"
 "Papa Loved Mama"
 "Two Piña Coladas" 
 "Unanswered Prayers"
 "Night Moves"
 "Standing Outside the Fire"
 "Rodeo"
 "Live Again" / "Let It Be" / "Hey Jude"
 "Ain't Goin' Down ('til the Sun Comes Up)"
 "The Thunder Rolls"
 "Callin' Baton Rouge"
 "Friends in Low Places"
 "The Dance"
 "She's Every Woman"
 "The Red Strokes"
 "Ireland"
 "More Than a Memory"
 "Guy Goin' Nowhere"
 "Turn the Page"
 "American Pie"

Personnel
 Robert Bailey – backing vocals
 Bruce Bouton – pedal steel guitar, lap steel guitar, electric guitar
 Garth Brooks – vocals, acoustic guitar, electric guitar
 Steve Cox – keyboards
 David Gant – keyboards
 Johnny Garcia – electric guitar
 Mark Greenwood – bass guitar, backing vocals
 Vicki Hampton – backing vocals
 Jimmy Mattingly – fiddle, acoustic guitar
 Mike Palmer – drums, percussion
 Karyn Rochelle – backing vocals, acoustic guitar

References

External links
 

2018 in American television
2018 television specials
CBS television specials
Music television specials